Accidental Empires: How the Boys of Silicon Valley Make Their Millions, Battle Foreign Competition, and Still Can't Get a Date (1992, 1996), is a book written by Mark Stephens under the pen name Robert X. Cringely about the founding of the personal computer industry and the history of Silicon Valley. 

The style of Accidental Empires is informal, and in the first chapter Cringley claims that he is not a historian but an explainer, and that "historians have a harder job because they can be faulted for what is left out; explainers like me can get away with printing only the juicy parts." Notably, the book was critical of Steve Jobs and Apple, as well as Bill Gates and Microsoft. The book described how companies in the technology industry were built and critiqued the public-relation campaigns that explained such narratives.

The book was revised and republished in 1996, with new material added. A documentary based on the book, called Triumph of the Nerds: The Rise of Accidental Empires was aired on PBS in 1996, with Cringely as the presenter. In November of 2011, a film based on the miniseries called Steve Jobs: The Lost Interview, was exhibited at the Landmark Theatres. It included the missing footage of the interview that Jobs did with Cringely in 1995 for the PBS documentary.  

In February 2012, Cringely wrote on his blog that he will republish the book online, free for all to read.

Release details
 1991, United States, Addison-Wesley Publishing Company, Inc , Pub date February 1992 Hardback
 1993, United States, HarperCollins , Pub date February 1993, Paperback
 1996, United States, HarperCollins , Pub date October 23, 1996, Hardback
 1996, United States, Penguin Books Ltd , Pub date April 4, 1996, Paperback

References

External links 
 Accidental Empires at Google Books
 Accidental Empires at the author's blog

1992 non-fiction books
Addison-Wesley books
Books about computer and internet companies
History books about the United States